John Wardle may refer to:

John Wardle (businessman) (born 1944), English businessman; former chairman of Manchester City football club
John Wardle (architect), Australian architect
Johnny Wardle (1923–1985), English cricketer
John Wardle, birth name of Jah Wobble (born 1958), English bass guitarist

See also 
Irving Wardle (1929–2023), English theatre critic and author.